Jansen may refer to:

People
 Jansen (surname), a Dutch surname, cognate of Johnson
 Pearl Jansen, a former South African beauty queen

Places
 Jansen, Saskatchewan, Canada
 Jansen, Colorado, United States
 Jansen, Nebraska, United States

Other uses
 Jansen AG, Swiss steel and plastic company, founded by Josef Jansen of Aachen
 Jansen (crater), lunar crater named after Dutch inventor of the telescope Sacharias Jansen
 Jansen's metaphyseal chondrodysplasia, rare disease discovered by the orthopedic surgeon Murk Jansen
 Jansenism, Catholic theological movement named after the Dutch theologian Cornelius Jansen

See also
 Janse, Dutch surname
 Janson (disambiguation), Scandinavian surname
 Janssen (disambiguation), Dutch surname
 Janssens, Dutch surname